The Blue Mountain Tunnel is one of two tunnels through Blue Mountain in Pennsylvania, located west of Newburg.

It was originally completed in 1940 with only one two lane section. An additional section was added in the 1960s carrying two additional lanes.

See also 
 Lehigh Tunnel, on the Pennsylvania Turnpike Northeast Extension, also cuts through Blue Mountain; but was given a different name to prevent confusion with the Blue Mountain tunnel farther west.

References 

Toll tunnels in Pennsylvania
Transportation buildings and structures in Franklin County, Pennsylvania
Pennsylvania Turnpike Commission
Road tunnels in Pennsylvania